The 24th Press Camp Headquarters (PCH) is an active-duty unit in the United States Army headquartered at Fort Bliss, Texas.  The unit consists of 31 public affairs and support personnel and is commanded by a lieutenant colonel assisted by a command sergeant major. 
 
The 24th Press Camp Headquarters’ primary mission is to operate a media operation center (MOC) in support of media personnel working in the theater of operations.   A PCH provides mission command, staff planning, and supervision of press camp operations. The PCH is a highly adaptable unit and can supervise and coordinate operations performed by other public affairs units in support of Army, joint, interagency, intergovernmental, coalition, and multinational partners.

The unit has four teams: command section, media escort section, briefing section and production section.  The PCH is capable of performing a multitude of tasks to include accrediting and escorting up to 100 media personnel a day, producing daily press conferences, acquiring video and photographic imagery and writing news stories, and providing the commander with real-time broadcast capabilities.
 
The 24th Press Camp Headquarters was originally constituted October 26, 1966, in the Regular Army as the 24th Public Information Detachment and officially activated November 3, 1966, at Fort Benjamin Harrison, Indiana.

The 24th PID served twice in Vietnam, from November 3, 1966, to October 15, 1968, and again from June 1, 1969, until June 30, 1970. During the unit’s service in Vietnam, it was awarded three Meritorious Unit Commendations and the Republic of Vietnam Cross of Gallantry with Palm.

On March 19, 2009, the U.S. Army designated the former 24th Public Information Detachment as the 24th Press Camp Headquarters and activated the unit at Fort Bliss, Texas, on October 16, 2010.

In October 2011, the 24th Press Camp Headquarters became the first active-duty press camp assigned to the chemical, biological, radiological, and nuclear defense support of civil authorities (CBRN-DSCA) response operations under Joint Task Force-Civil Support  (JTF-CS).  This one-year defense support of civil authorities (DSCA) mission required the unit to be on 24-hour prepare-to-deploy status to respond to any stateside CBRN incident.  The unit again assumed the CBRN-DSCA mission in October 2013 and will be on call until May 2015.

Moved under command of the 1st Armored Division Artillery in August 2014, the 24th Press Camp Headquarters also serves as the headquarters for the 16th Mobile Public Affairs Detachment (MPAD).  Over the past three years, Soldiers from the 24th and 16th have supported various missions and deployed to numerous countries including Afghanistan, Kuwait, Colombia, Mexico and Indonesia.

References

 FM 3–61, Fundamentals of Public Affairs Operations.
 U.S. Army 24th Press Camp Headquarters Lineage
 Joint Task Force-Civil Support (JTF-CS) mission statement http://www.jtfcs.northcom.mil/JTFCS.aspx

External links
 24th PCH Facebook Page

Public affairs units and formations of the United States Army